The 75 mm gun, models M2 to M6, was the standard American medium caliber gun fitted to mobile platforms during World War II. They were primarily mounted on tanks, such as the M3 Lee and M4 Sherman, but also the B-25 Mitchell medium bomber aircraft, etc. There were five main variants used during the war: M2, M3, M4, M5 and M6.

They were considered the standard American tank guns. The M2 and M3 were used on the M3 medium tank, the M3 was used on the M4 Sherman tank, and the M6 was used on the M24 Chaffee light tank. The M3 was also used on Medium Tank M7.

The M4 variant was fitted on some North American B-25 Mitchell medium bomber aircraft.

History

The 75 mm tank gun has its origins in the French Canon de 75 modèle 1897 field gun of World War I , which was also adopted by the United States and used well into World War II as the 75 mm M1897 field gun. The tank and field guns fired the same range of 75x350R ammunition. The primary round was the 6.76 kg (14.9 lb) M48 high explosive round, which travelled at 625 m/s (2,050 ft/s) and contained 1.5 pounds (680 g) of TNT filling (2845 kilojoules of explosive energy) and a choice of two fuzes, the super quick (SQ) and the delay (PD), which had delays of 0.05 and 0.15 seconds respectively. SQ was the standard setting, with PD used against structures, gun positions or lightly protected vehicles. The field gun origins of the ordnance and ammunition ensured that the M2/3/6 series HE round was highly effective for its caliber. The M48 was available in two versions, standard and supercharge, which had an increased propellent charge for greater muzzle velocity ( vs. ) and range (2,300 yards greater).

Other rounds fired by the 75 mm tank guns included the T30 canister shot for use against troops in the open at short range. This, which was essentially a giant shotgun shell full of large numbers of steel balls, was used primarily in the Pacific. There was also the M89 base-ejecting hexachloroethane (HC) smoke round and the M64 white phosphorus (WP or "Willy Pete") round, which proved highly effective in the bocage fighting around Normandy. Finally, there were two different armor-piercing rounds.

The first armor-piercing round was the  M72 AP-T, a plain uncapped armor-piercing round whose performance dropped off as range increased due to poor aerodynamics. The M72 was replaced by the 6.63 kg (14.62 lb) M61 armor-piercing ballistic capped high explosive with tracer (APCBC-HE-T) shell. The blunt armor-piercing cap, made of a softer metal, helped to prevent shell shatter at higher velocities and against sloped and face-hardened armor. The aerodynamic ballistic cap acted as a windscreen and improved ballistic performance, maintained velocity, and hence increased penetration at longer ranges. Once the projectile had penetrated the target, a small explosive charge contained in a cavity at the base of the shell would detonate, shattering the shell and increasing damage inside the enemy vehicle. The tracer helped in the aiming of a second shot. In practice, the majority of M61 rounds were shipped without the explosive filler.

The M61A1 used an improved method of attaching the ballistic cap to the shell. The M61 had a muzzle velocity of 617 m/s (2024.28 ft/s) and was credited with the ability to penetrate  of rolled homogeneous armor plate at 0° from vertical at 500 yards range, which was a quite acceptable performance by the standards of 1942. This ammunition type proved lethal to the Panzer III and IV (up to Ausf. F2), as these tanks were protected by a maximum of 50 mm of face-hardened armor with little slope, which the 75 mm M3 with M61 was capable of penetrating from at least 1,500 m. However, in March 1942, the Germans introduced the Ausf. G version of the Panzer IV, which was armed with the 48-caliber long KwK 40 gun, and had frontal hull armour increased to 80 mm - however, its turret and gun mantlet retained their 50 mm thickness. This was somewhat compensated by the M4 Sherman's improved armor over the earlier M3 Lee making up for the 75mm M3's diminishing battlefield dominance; Wa Pruef 1 estimated that the M4's standard 56º-angled glacis was impenetrable to the KwK 40 when standing at a 30-degree side angle, while the 75 mm M3 could penetrate the Ausf G's hull from 100 m in the same situation.

British tanks in the early years of World War II relied on high-velocity, smaller-calibre anti-tank guns, such as the 40 mm calibre Ordnance QF 2 pounder and, later, 57 mm calibre Ordnance QF 6 pounder, for their primary armament. As tank guns, these had the great disadvantage of either not having a truly effective HE round or not having an HE round at all. Post-war, the UK's Tank Museum credited the US 75mm gun as "America's most important contribution to tank warfare" because of its ability to combine good (for the time) AP and HE performance. They believed that the American observers working with the British before Dunkirk had appreciated the effectiveness of such a dual purpose weapon, and so it was made a prime requirement for US tank production.

After experiencing the effectiveness of the American 75 mm tank guns in the infantry support role, the British opted to adopt the American caliber and ammunition by the expedient of boring-out the 6 pounder tank gun to make the Ordnance QF 75 mm. By 1944, this had become the standard British tank gun, equipping the Cromwell tank and Churchill tank for the campaigns in northwest Europe.

Variants

T6

Experimental anti-aircraft gun based on the M1897 field gun. The barrel was shortened from 36 to 31 calibers, and the Nordenfelt screw breech replaced with the sliding block breech.

T7 / M2

Adaptation of the T6 for tank gun role. Used on the early M3 Lee.
Barrel length: 31 calibers
Muzzle velocity: 588 m/s (1,929 ft/s) with M72 AP shell

T8 / M3

Longer derivative of the M2. Equipped American and British vehicles such as the M4 Sherman, the later models of the M3 Lee and the Churchill III/IV (scavenged from Sherman tanks in the North African theatre). The US Army also experimented with mounting the M3 on various wheeled carriages for use as anti-tank gun, but the program was cancelled due to a lack of requirement.

Barrel length: 40 calibers (3m)
Muzzle velocity: 619 m/s (2,031 ft/s) with M72 AP shell

M4

The 75 mm aircraft gun M4 is a modification of the M3 gun found in medium tanks. It differs from the M3 gun, only in having a seat for the spline machined in the tube. It was mounted on the M6 mount.

T13E1 / M5

A lightweight version of the M3 with a lighter thin-walled barrel and a different recoil mechanism that was used in the Douglas A-26 Invader and the B-25H Mitchell bomber. It uses the same ammunition and has the same ballistics as the M3.

M6

A version derived from the T13E1 for the M24 Chaffee.

Barrel length: 39 calibres (2,92 m)
Muzzle velocity: 619 m/s (2,031 ft/s) with M72 AP shell

M2 M3 M6
Maximum Rate of Fire (ROF): 20 rounds per minute

Penetration comparison

See also
List of U.S. Army weapons by supply catalog designation
List of artillery

Weapons of comparable role, performance and era
 Ordnance QF 75 mm : contemporary British tank gun
 7.5 cm KwK 40 : contemporary German tank gun
 F-34 tank gun : contemporary Soviet tank gun

References

Sources 
 Zaloga, Steven J., Brian Delf – US Anti-tank Artillery 1941–45 (2005) Osprey Publishing (New Vanguard 107), .
 
 TM 9-2800 Standard Artillery and Fire Control Material (dated February 1944)

External links

Armor penetration table of US 75 mm M3 L/40 guns (search for Intelligence then Text Database of Penetration Data and select US guns)
U.S. 75mm M61 Tank Round – WWII

75 mm artillery
World War II artillery of the United States
World War II tank guns
M4 Sherman tanks
Aircraft artillery
Weapons and ammunition introduced in 1941
Tank guns of the United States